The 2019 Phillip Island SuperSprint (known for sponsorship purposes as the WD-40 Phillip Island SuperSprint) was a motor racing event for the Supercars Championship, held on 12-14 April 2019. The event was held at the Phillip Island Grand Prix Circuit on Phillip Island, Victoria, and consisted of one race of 120 kilometres (27 laps) and one race of 200 kilometres (45 laps) in length. It was the fourth event of fifteen in the 2019 Supercars Championship and hosted Races 9 and 10 of the season.

The event was dominated by DJR Team Penske. Scott McLaughlin claimed both pole positions and won Race 9 while teammate Fabian Coulthard won Race 10.

Report

Background
Scott McLaughlin entered the event holding a championship lead of 124 points over teammate Fabian Coulthard.

The format of this event was changed from the previous format of two 250 kilometre races to a SuperSprint format consisting of one race of 120 kilometres and one race consisting of 200 kilometres. The event was moved to become a double-header with the Tasmania SuperSprint on the previous weekend.

A new safety car procedure was trialled at this event. The trial saw the pitlane closed when a safety car was called in a bid to ease congestion and double stacking. Any car which had not completed its compulsory pit stop at the time the safety car was called would therefore have to wait until after the end of the safety car period to take its stop. Phillip Island was chosen as the venue for this trial due to its narrow pit lane and small pit bays.

Results

Practice

Race 9

Qualifying

Race

Race 10

Qualifying

Race

References

Phillip Island SuperSprint
Phillip Island SuperSprint